Filippo Soffici (born 9 February 1970) is an Italian rower.

References

External links
 
 

1970 births
Living people
Italian male rowers
Sportspeople from Florence
Rowers at the 1992 Summer Olympics
Olympic bronze medalists for Italy
Olympic rowers of Italy
Olympic medalists in rowing
World Rowing Championships medalists for Italy
Medalists at the 1992 Summer Olympics
Rowers of Fiamme Oro
20th-century Italian people
21st-century Italian people